Johann Sebastian Bach composed the church cantata  (My heart swims in blood) 199 in Weimar between 1711 and 1714, and performed it on the eleventh Sunday after Trinity, 12 August 1714. It is a solo cantata for soprano.

The text was written by Georg Christian Lehms and published in Darmstadt in 1711 in the collection , on the general topic of redemption. The librettist wrote a series of alternating recitatives and arias, and included as the sixth movement (of eight) the third stanza of Johann Heermann's hymn "". It is not known when Bach composed the work, but he performed it as part of his monthly cantata productions on the eleventh Sunday after Trinity, 12 August 1714. The solo voice is accompanied by a Baroque instrumental ensemble of oboe, strings and continuo. The singer expresses in a style similar to Baroque opera the dramatic development from feeling like a "monster in God's eyes" to being forgiven. Bach revised the work for later performances, leading to three different editions in the Neue Bach-Ausgabe.

History and words 

On 2 March 1714 Bach was appointed concertmaster of the Weimar court orchestra (Kapelle) of the co-reigning dukes Wilhelm Ernst and Ernst August of Saxe-Weimar. As concertmaster, he assumed the principal responsibility for composing new works, specifically cantatas for the Schlosskirche (palace church), on a monthly schedule. He performed the cantata on the Eleventh Sunday after Trinity as the fifth cantata of the series, following . The prescribed readings for the Sunday were from the First Epistle to the Corinthians, on the gospel of Christ and his (Paul's) duty as an apostle, and from the Gospel of Luke, the parable of the Pharisee and the Tax Collector.

The text, which concerns a sinner seeking and finding redemption, was written by Georg Christian Lehms. Lehms was based in Darmstadt, and it is not known whether Bach knew him personally, but he may well have had access to Lehms's 1711 publication , which includes this text and that of another solo cantata, Widerstehe doch der Sünde, BWV 54, performed the month before. The third stanza of Johann Heermann's hymn "" is integrated as the sixth movement, to the melody of "Auf meinen lieben Gott". The text in the first person shows the dramatic change of a person initially feeling as "a monster in God's eyes" to finally feeling accepted as God's child. The cantata text was set to music in 1712 by Christoph Graupner in Darmstadt. It is not known if Bach knew of Graupner's composition. The text has no specific relation to the prescribed readings, therefore it is possible that Bach may have already composed the work before his promotion to concert master with regular Sunday services, like the other cantata on a text by Lehms.

Bach first performed the cantata on 12 August 1714. When he performed it again in Leipzig on the eleventh Sunday after Trinity in 1723 (8 August) it was the first solo cantata and the most operatic work which he had presented to the congregation up to that point. He made revisions for that performance, such as transposing it from C minor to D minor and changing the obbligato viola to violoncello piccolo. In the same service, he also performed a new work, : one before and one after the sermon.

The Neue Bach-Ausgabe recognises three distinct versions: the Weimar version, a Köthen version, and the Leipzig version.

Music

Structure and scoring 

The cantata, structured in eight movements, is scored as chamber music for a solo soprano voice (S), and a Baroque instrumental ensemble of oboe (Ob), violins (Vl), viola (Va), and basso continuo (Bc) including bassoon (Fg) and violone (Vo). In the Weimar version, it is in C minor, with a viola as the obbligato instrument in movement 6. The title page of the parts for this version reads: "Geistliche Cantate / Mein Herze schwimt im Blut / â / Soprano solo / 1 Hautb. / 2 Viol. / Viola / e / Basso / di / J.S.Bach". In the Leipzig version, it is in D minor, with an obbligato violoncello piccolo instead of the viola.

In the following table of the movements, the scoring follows the Neue Bach-Ausgabe. The keys and time signatures are taken from Alfred Dürr, using the symbol for common time (4/4). The continuo, playing throughout, is not shown.

Movements 

Although limited to one soprano voice, Bach achieves a variety of musical expression in the eight movements. All but one recitative are accompanied by the strings (accompagnato), and only movement 5 is secco, accompanied by the continuo only. The solo voice is treated to dramatic declamation, close to contemporary opera.

1 
A recitative sets the scene, "" ("My heart swims in blood").

Mein Herze schwimmt im Blut,
Weil mich der Sünden Brut
In Gottes heilgen Augen
Zum Ungeheuer macht.
My heart swims in blood,
since the offspring of my sins
in the holy eyes of God
make me a monster.

The musicologist Julian Mincham explains that it "drips with the self-obsessed agonies of sin, pain and abandonment ... with the torment of an abandoned soul swamped by its own sin and sorrow. Its finely wrought contours portray dramatically the vacillating emotions ranging from horror and terror to lonely and dispirited resignation."

2 
The first aria, a da capo aria, "" (Mute sighs, silent cries), is accompanied by the oboe. The theme of the ritornello is present throughout the movement. The middle section begins with a dissonance to stress the sorrowful image of "" ("And you, moist springs of tears"). It ends with a passage set as a secco recitative, described by Mincham: "Time almost appears to stand still with this final expression of misery".

3 
The following recitative, "" ("But God must be gracious to me"), ends in a statement of repentance.

4 
The second aria, "" ("Deeply bowed and filled with regret"), is dominated by rich string sound. An adagio passage leads to the da capo. The aria expresses repentance in a "civilised and refined minuet".

5 
A short secco recitative, "" ("Upon this painful repentance"), introduces the following hymn stanza. It begins with "a musical echo of the torments of the heart swimming in blood".

6 

The only chorale stanza of the work is "" ("I, Your troubled child"), the third stanza of Johann Heermann's "" ("Where should I flee"), published in 1630. Its term "troubled child" is a good summary of the position of the human being in relation to God. The wording of its conclusion, "In deine tiefen Wunden, da ich stets Heil gefunden" ("into Your deep wounds, where I have always found salvation") leads to the following recitative. The voice is accompanied by an obbligato viola (violoncello piccolo in the Leipzig version) in a lively figuration.

Bach used a rather unusual melody by Caspar von Stieler, whereas he based his later chorale cantata on this hymn on the melody by Jacob Regnart. The hymn is treated as in a chorale fantasia, with string ritornellos between the verses.

7 

The last recitative, "" ("I lay myself on these wounds"), introduces a different mood; the final measures are a "soaring melisma", a "joyously uplifting prelude" to the last movement.

8 
The final aria, "" ("How joyful is my heart"), expresses joy as a cheerful gigue, with a long coloratura on "" (joyful). It is comparable to the gigues in Bach's French Suites. Mincham concludes:

Recordings 

The work has been recorded often, both by Bach specialists and others. The listing is taken from the selection on the Bach Cantatas Website, which lists 58 recordings . Ensembles playing on period instruments in historically informed performance are marked by green background.

References

Sources 
 
 
 
 
 BWV 199 Mein Herze schwimmt im Blut English translation, University of Vermont

External links 
 Mein Herze schwimmt im Blut, BWV 199: performance by the Netherlands Bach Society (video and background information)

Church cantatas by Johann Sebastian Bach
1714 compositions